Rhynchopyga metaphaea is a moth in the subfamily Arctiinae. It is found in Mexico.

References

Moths described in 1898
Euchromiina